Hans-Georg Dulz (31 October 1936 – 16 February 2022) was a German footballer who played as a midfielder or forward. He spent five seasons in the Bundesliga with Eintracht Braunschweig. Dulz died on 16 February 2022, at the age of 85.

Honours
Eintracht Braunschweig
 Bundesliga: 1966–67

References

External links
 

1936 births
2022 deaths
German footballers
Association football midfielders
Association football forwards
Bundesliga players
Borussia Dortmund players
SSV Reutlingen 05 players
Hamburger SV players
Eintracht Braunschweig players
FC Aarau players